Jesse Williams may refer to:
Jesse Williams (actor) (born 1980), American television actor
Jesse Williams (American football) (born 1990), American football defensive tackle
Jesse Williams (high jumper) (born 1983), American high jumper
Jesse Williams (Canadian football) (1940–2015), Canadian football player
Jesse Williams (footballer, born 1903) (1903–1972), Welsh international footballer
Jesse Williams (footballer, born 2001), Trinidadian international footballer
Jesse Williams (shortstop) (1913–1990), American Negro league baseball player
Jesse Williams (catcher) (1923–1996), American Negro league baseball player
Jesse Lynch Williams (1871–1929), author and dramatist
Jesse M. Williams (1831–1864), American Civil War soldier
Jesse West (Jesse Williams, born 1967), producer

See also
Jessie Williams (disambiguation)
Jessica Williams (disambiguation)